Antonio Lefebvre d'Ovidio (1913 – 5 February 2011) was an Italian lawyer and businessman, and the founder of Silversea Cruises.

He was born in Naples in 1913.

Lefebvre worked as a maritime lawyer and taught maritime and commercial law at the Bari University until he became a professor at Bari, Naples and Rome Universities in 1938.

Lefebvre began buying cargo ships and ferries in the Adriatic. He went on to own Sitmar Cruises, which was merged with Princess Cruises in 1988 to form Silversea Cruises.

He died on 5 February 2011.

His son, Manfredi Lefebvre d'Ovidio, became the chairman and owner of Silversea.

Lockheed scandal

Lefebvre was convicted in 1979 for corruption connected to $1.6 million in bribes Lockheed paid in connection with the Italian Air Force's 1970 purchase of 14 military transport aircraft. He was sentenced to two years and two months in prison.

References

1913 births
2011 deaths
Antonio
Lockheed bribery scandals